Namsan-dong is a legal dong, or neighbourhood of the Jung-gu district in Seoul, South Korea and governed by its administrative dong, Myeong-dong.

References

External links
 Jung-gu Official site in English
 Jung-gu Official site
 Jung-gu Tour Guide from the Official site
 Status quo of Jung-gu 
 Resident offices and maps of Jung-gu 

Neighbourhoods of Jung-gu, Seoul